The House of Zedtwitz is the name of an old and distinguished German noble family, which also belonged to the Bohemian nobility. The family originated from Franconia, Germany.

History 
The family first appeared in a written document in 1235 and later in 1288 where progenitor Berthold von Zedwitz is mentioned. Between c. 1400 and c. 1945 it ruled the region around the town of Aš. The family had several lines, one of which was Baronial and the other branch received the title of Imperial Count in 1766, as well as Count in Bavaria on 25. August 1790 by Charles Theodore, Elector of Bavaria.

Properties

Notable members 
 Curt Franz Wenzel Christoph Erdmann Zedtwitz, Graf von Moraván und Duppau (1822–1909)
 Peter Emanuel Freiherr von Zedtwitz(-Liebenstein) (1715–1786) (de)

See also 
 The von Zedtwitz Life Master Pairs, national bridge championship

Zedtwitz
Franconian nobility
German Bohemian noble families
German Bohemian people